The Pridvorica Monastery is a monastery of the Serbian Orthodox Church, built in the 12th century, at the same time as the nearby Studenica. It has the status of cultural monument of great importance. It is located in the village of Pridvorica, Ivanjica. 

According to the architectural characteristics it is a typical example of medieval Raška school. Church of the Transfiguration is a single-nave, one-dome building with a semicircular apse at the east. The external facade is decorated with a frieze of blind arcades.

It was built by a servant who worked at the court of Nemanjićs around 1195. Hence the name Pridvorica. A testimony of this are minor, but valuable remains of frescoes in the upper reaches of the temple. Initially this was a nunnery, which is confirmed by Nemanja's charter to the monastery of Studenica. The nuns were engaged in weaving and were passing the skills to the local population, as evidenced by a fully authentic style of weaving in this region; it was then the local Church for centuries, and since 2007 it was again declared the monastery, but a male one. Abbot of the monastery, and two novices live in the monastery. Pridvorica is on the 28th kilometer of road from Ivanjica to Studenica.

The building itself was twice renewed, which in many ways changed its exterior: for the first time after 1557, and the second time in mid-nineteenth century. During the second renewal, an iconostasis was painted at the gates, signed by Sreten Protić Molerović 1835. Pridvorica monastery church is dedicated to the Transfiguration. The monastery is one of the few in Serbia who have their own Coat of arms.

Gallery

References

External links

 Republic Institute for Protection of Cultural Monuments - Belgrade
 Immovable Cultural Heritage
 List of Monuments

 

Cultural Monuments of Great Importance (Serbia)
Serbian Orthodox monasteries in Serbia
Christian monasteries established in the 12th century
12th-century Serbian Orthodox church buildings
Tourist attractions in Serbia
Landmarks in Serbia
Ivanjica